Lontong is an Indonesian dish made of compressed rice cake in the form of a cylinder wrapped inside a banana leaf, commonly found in Indonesia, Malaysia and Singapore. Rice is rolled inside a banana leaf and boiled, then cut into small cakes as a staple food replacement of steamed rice. The texture is similar to those of ketupat, with the difference being that the ketupat container is made from woven janur (young coconut leaf) fronds, while lontong uses banana leaf instead.

It is commonly called nasi himpit (lit. "pressed rice") in Malaysia, despite being created using other methods.

Arem-arem is a smaller version of lontong, filled with vegetables and occasionally meat, eaten as a snack.

The dish is usually served hot or at room temperature with peanut sauce-based dishes such as gado-gado, karedok, ketoprak, other traditional salads, and satay. It can be eaten as an accompaniment to coconut milk-based soups, such as lontong sayur, soto, gulai and curries. It is also used as an alternative to vermicelli noodles.

History
The origin of lontong is from ketupat. Both are made from the main ingredient of steamed rice in a banana leaf wrapper or young coconut leaf. Initially lontong was only considered as ordinary food. However, after the spread of Islam to Java, the tradition of eating lontong and ketupat began. Sunan Kalijaga was the first to introduce lontong to Javanese people, including ketupat. This is part of the da'wah carried out by Sunan Kalijaga at that time. Lontong is often served with Gulai sauce and vegetables, chayote, tempeh, tofu, tauco, boiled egg, sambal and crackers.

Preparation 

Lontong is traditionally made by boiling the rice until it is partially cooked and packing it tightly into a rolled-up banana leaf. The leaf is secured with lidi semat, wooden needle made from the central rib of coconut leaf, and cooked in boiling water for about 90 minutes. Once the compacted rice has cooled, it can be cut up into bite-sized pieces. Outer parts of lontong usually have greenish color because of the chlorophyll left by banana leaf rubbing off on rice cake surface.

Alternative ways of cooking lontong include placing uncooked rice into a muslin bag then letting the water seep in and cause the rice to form a solid mass. Another popular and easier method is by using commercially available plastic pouches; rice-filled and punctured with needle to create small holes to allow the water to seep into the package, which are then boiled until the rice becomes cooked and have fully filled up the pouch. This method was meant to imitate the banana leaf's liquid permeability. Nevertheless, the use of organic banana leaf is highly recommended for better health and ecological reasons.

On the other hand, Malaysian nasi himpit (lit. "pressed rice") is traditionally created differently. The method is more a mechanical pressure than applying permeable boiling technique; freshly cooked rice is compressed for a few hours between two heavy stone slabs or two trays with a heavy weight on top to produce nasi himpit. However, nasi himpit is now usually speedily produced in water permeable plastic sachets filled with rice and boiled in water.

Dishes 
Just like rice, the taste of lontong is bland and neutral, it depends on other ingredients to give taste through spices and sauces. Commonly, lontong serves as the compact alternative of steamed rice. It can be served with almost any traditional dish recipes as staple food, but mostly have peanut sauce or coconut milk-based soup.

Indonesia

Lontong sayur 

In Indonesia, especially among Betawi people, lontong usually served as lontong sayur, pieces of lontong served in coconut milk soup with shredded chayote, tempeh, tofu, hard-boiled egg, sambal and kerupuk. Lontong sayur is related and quite similar to Ketupat sayur and is a favourite breakfast menu next to bubur ayam and nasi uduk.

Lontong cap go meh 

The more elaborate recipe of lontong is lontong cap go meh, a Peranakan Chinese Indonesian adaptation on traditional Indonesian dishes, lontong served with rich opor ayam, sayur lodeh, sambal goreng ati (beef liver in sambal), acar, telur pindang (hard boiled tea egg), abon (beef floss), and koya powder (mixture of soy and dried shrimp powder). Lontong cap go meh usually consumed by Chinese Indonesian community during Cap go meh celebration.

Lontong dekem 

Lontong dekem is originated from Pemalang Regency, Central Java. The process involves soaking the lontong  in soup until it is submerged hence the name dekem meaning "immersion" in Pemalang Javanese dialect.

Lontong kari 

Lontong kari is lontong serve in soupy chicken curry and vegetables. Kari was first brought to Indonesia by Buddhist monks from India.

Lontong kikil 
Lontong kikil is lontong serve in spicy cow's trotters soup and vegetables.

Lontong kupang 
Another lontong recipes are lontong kupang and lontong balap from Surabaya and Sidoarjo area in East Java. Lontong kupang is made of lontong served with small white clams.

Lontong balap 

Also from Surabaya, lontong balap is made from lontong, taoge (bean sprouts), fried tofu, lentho (fried mashed beans), fried shallots, sambal petis and sweet soy sauce. East Javanese lontong and tofu recipes are known of their distinctive flavour, acquired from generous amount of petis (a type of shrimp paste).

Lontong gulai pakis 
In West Sumatra, a Minang dish from Padang Pariaman is called lontong gulai pakis, lontong served with young fern leaves gulai. Usually served with hard boiled eggs and kerupuk jangek or krupuk kulit (cow skin crackers).

Arem-arem 

Arem-arem is the smaller size lontong filled with diced vegetables such as carrot, common bean and potato seasoned with salt and red chili, or tofu, oncom and tempeh; sometimes also filled with minced meat or abon (beef floss), are eaten as snack. The rice is flavored with coconut milk. This kind of snack is called arem-arem in Javanese, but commonly called simply as lontong or lontong isi in other parts of Indonesia. It is a common snack in Java, and quite similar to lemper, but use common rice instead of sticky rice lemper. It usually uses thin young banana leaf as wrapper, a thin light yellow-green colored banana leaf. Lontong on the other hand, usually uses thicker mature banana leaf. The texture of arem-arem snack is softer compared to those of common lontong, due to thinner banana leaf, addition of coconut milk and prolonged boiling and steaming period.

Malaysia and Singapore 
It is commonly called nasi himpit (lit. "pressed rice") in Malaysia, and unlike lontong, nasi himpit is created by pressing rice overnight. The lontong rice cake is cut into smaller pieces, these rice cakes pieces are known as nasi himpit (compressed rice). The term lontong in Malaysia and Singapore usually refers a dish which consists of rice cakes in a coconut based soup such as sayur lodeh containing shrimp and vegetables like chopped cabbage, turnip and carrots. Additional condiments are added either during cooking or in individual servings. These include things such as fried tempeh, fried tofu, boiled eggs, dried cuttlefish sambal, fried spicy shredded coconut (serunding kelapa), fried chicken etc.

Nasi himpit is also an accompaniment to satay and eaten with peanut sauce. In the east coast states of Peninsular Malaysia, nasi himpit is eaten with peanut sauce (kuah kacang) for breakfast. Nasi himpit is also one of the ingredients in the Malaysian version of chicken soto.

See also

 Burasa
 Ketupat, a similar dish with container made from weaved janur (young palm leaves)
 Lemper
 Lepet

References

Indonesian snack foods
Indonesian rice dishes
Javanese cuisine
Malay cuisine
Malaysian cuisine
Cocossian cuisine